Baywatch is an American action drama television series about lifeguards who patrol the beaches of Los Angeles County, California, and Hawaii, starring David Hasselhoff. It was created by Michael Berk, Douglas Schwartz, and Gregory J. Bonann, who produced the show throughout its 11-season run. The series focuses on both professional and personal challenges faced by the characters, portrayed by a large rotating ensemble cast that includes Pamela Anderson, Alexandra Paul, Gregory Alan Williams, Jeremy Jackson, Parker Stevenson, David Chokachi, Billy Warlock, Erika Eleniak, David Charvet, Yasmine Bleeth, and Nicole Eggert.

The show was cancelled after its first season on NBC, but survived through syndication and later became the most-watched television series in the world, with a weekly audience of over 1.1 billion viewers despite consistently negative critical reviews, earning it a reputation as a pop cultural phenomenon and frequent source of allusion and parody. The show ran in its original title and format from 1989 to 1999. From 1999 to 2001, with a setting change and large cast overhaul, it was known as Baywatch: Hawaii.

It spawned a spin-off series, Baywatch Nights, which aired for two seasons from 1995 to 1997, and a 2017 feature film adaptation.

Overview
Baywatch revolves around the work of a team of lifeguards and their interpersonal relationships, with plots usually centering on dangers related to the beach and other activities pertinent to the California (later Hawaii) beach lifestyle. Topics from earthquakes and shark attacks to serial killers serve as plot conflicts on the show. Saving people from drowning is one of the most typical situations used in the shows.

Episodes

Cast

Baywatch is noted for its large ensemble cast with various members "rotating" in-and-out of the show, similar to many long-running soap operas. By the end of the 11 season run, not a single member of the original cast was still in the cast. David Hasselhoff appeared in the most episodes (totalling 206 including the pilot), followed by Jeremy Jackson (117), Michael Newman (109), and Pamela Anderson (77).

Following the Hawaii retool, many of the series longtime cast members left the show. The only remaining cast members were David Hasselhoff, Brooke Burns, Michael Bergin, and Michael Newman. Following the 10th season, Hasselhoff and Newman both left the series, leaving Bergin and Burns the only remnants of the show's original "L.A. era".

Baywatch (1989–1999) 

 David Hasselhoff as Mitch Buchannon
 Parker Stevenson as Craig Pomeroy
 Shawn Weatherly as Jill Riley
 Billy Warlock as Eddie Kramer
 Erika Eleniak as Shauni McClain
 Peter Phelps as Trevor Cole
 Brandon Call as Hobie Buchannon
 Holly Gagnier as Gina Pomeroy
 Monte Markham as Don Thorpe
 John Allen Nelson as John D. Cort
 Gregory Alan Williams as Garner Ellerbee
 Jeremy Jackson as Hobie Buchannon
 Tom McTigue as Harvey Miller
 Richard Jaeckel as Ben Edwards
 Nicole Eggert as Summer Quinn
 David Charvet as Matt Brody
 Pamela Anderson as C. J. Parker
 Kelly Slater as Jimmy Slade
 Alexandra Paul as Stephanie Holden
 Yasmine Bleeth as Caroline Holden
 Jaason Simmons as Logan Fowler
 David Chokachi as Cody Madison
 Gena Lee Nolin as Neely Capshaw
 Donna D'Errico as Donna Marco
 José Solano as Manny Gutierrez
 Traci Bingham as Jordan Tate
 Nancy Valen as Samantha Thomas
 Michael Newman as Michael Newman
 Carmen Electra as Lani McKenzie
 Kelly Packard as April Giminski
 Michael Bergin as J. D. Darius
 Angelica Bridges as Taylor Walsh
 Marliece Andrada as Skylar Bergman
 Mitzi Kapture as Alex Ryker
 Brooke Burns as Jessie Owens

Baywatch Hawaii (1999–2001) 

 David Hasselhoff as Mitch Buchannon
 Brooke Burns as Jessie Owens
 Michael Bergin as J. D. Darius
 Brandy Ledford as Dawn Masterton
 Michael Newman as Michael Newman
 Simmone Mackinnon as Allie Reese
 Jason Momoa as Jason Ioane
 Stacy Kamano as Kekoa Tanaka
 Jason Brooks as Sean Monroe
 Brande Roderick as Leigh Dyer
 Charlie Brumbly as Zach McEwan
 Krista Allen as Jenna Avid

Production history
Baywatch debuted on NBC in 1989, but was cancelled after only one season, when it placed 73rd out of 103 shows in the seasonal ratings, and also because the production studio, GTG, (a joint venture of television station owner Gannett Company, later spun off into Tegna, and Grant Tinker, which was established only to produce the newsmagazine based on Gannett's newspaper USA Today) went out of business.  Due to high production costs, GTG was unable to finance the series any further.

Feeling the series still had potential, David Hasselhoff, one of the principal actors, along with creators and executive producers Michael Berk, Douglas Schwartz, and Gregory J. Bonann, revived it for the first-run syndication market in 1991. Hasselhoff was given the title of executive producer for his work on bringing the show back. The series was hugely successful, especially internationally.

The show led to a spin-off, Baywatch Nights, and three direct-to-video films: Baywatch the Movie: Forbidden Paradise, Baywatch: White Thunder at Glacier Bay, and Baywatch: Hawaiian Wedding.

The audience was 65 percent female, with its number one audience being women aged 18 to 34. Speaking in 2001, Schwartz explained that, after doing focus groups on Baywatch for about five years, they learned that the show appealed to this demographic because "most of [its] lead characters were strong, independent women who were heroic, who were saving lives, who were equal to men".

Filming
Will Rogers State Beach served as the predominant beach location for Baywatch, although some scenes were filmed at Long Beach, California, and in Malibu, California.

Theme song
The original NBC theme was "Save Me", performed by Peter Cetera, with Bonnie Raitt on guitar and Richard Sterban, bass singer for The Oak Ridge Boys, as one of the background vocalists. The song is from Cetera's 1988 album One More Story. David Hasselhoff also recorded a duet with Laura Branigan which was hugely successful for being broadcast as the closing track of the Baywatch TV series. The single I Believe was originally released on CD album in 1994.

Baywatch: Hawaii
In 1999, with production costs rising in Los Angeles, and the syndication market shrinking, the producers sought to move the production elsewhere. They filmed a pilot and announced plans to title the show Baywatch: Down Under. However, strong local opposition from residents of Avalon Beach, New South Wales eventually led to Pittwater Council, the local government area of which Avalon was part of, to permanently ban future production. As an alternative to Australia, Hawaii offered the producers large financial incentives to move the show to the islands, instead, and in season 10, Baywatch: Hawaii was launched.

Baywatch filmed for two seasons in Hawaii, from 1999 until 2001. April Masini, a newspaper advice columnist, pitched the move to executive producer Gregory J. Bonann. The agreement mandated that addition of the subtitle, to Baywatch: Hawaii, as well as the hiring local production crew, filming on-location for at least two years, and producing 44 episodes, each at a cost of about US$870,000 (climbing up to $1.1 million), 60% of which was to be spent in Hawaii. The series was cancelled due to poor ratings.

Home media

 Australia: On May 1, 2013, Shock Entertainment released seasons 1–9 on DVD.  They also released a complete series set on November 6, 2013, which features all nine seasons of Baywatch, both seasons of Baywatch Hawaii and both seasons of Baywatch Nights.
 France: The reunion film Baywatch: Hawaiian Wedding was translated to French language as Alerte à Malibu: Mariage à Hawaï and has been released.
 Finland: Seasons 1–3 have been released by Future Film.
 Germany: Seasons 1–11 have been released. These releases are presented exactly as they originally aired, albeit with German language credits (these are also available in the U.K. from Amazon as imports). The reunion film Baywatch: Hawaiian Wedding was translated to German language as Baywatch: Hochzeit auf Hawaii and has been released.
 Italy: Seasons 1–2 have been released by Koch Media, season 5–6 have been released by Sony Pictures Home Entertainment.
 Netherlands: Season 3 has been released.
 Sweden: Seasons 1–3 have been released.
 United Kingdom: Seasons 1–6 have been released by Network.  In 2017, to coincide with the release of the feature film adaptation, Network released a DVD entitled Best of Baywatch which includes the two-part episodes "Nightmare Bay" and "River of No Return".
 United States: In June 1999, a single disc DVD was released featuring two 2-part episodes from the show's original run ("Nightmare Bay" parts 1 and 2 from season 2, and "River of No Return" parts 1 and 2 from season 3). These episodes are absent from the U.S. box sets of their respective seasons mentioned below.

First Look Studios released the first three seasons on DVD in 2006/2007. Although the box sets are labeled "Season 1", "Season 2", etc., the sets actually feature episodes of the following season (i.e., the "Season 1" box set contains the episodes of the literal second season (1991–1992) of the show). The second and third sets were released on October 31, 2006. Each set features a disc with season 1 (NBC) episodes on it. These releases also do not contain any of the original music as it appeared when the episodes aired. They have been removed due to copyright agreements. However, these releases have been discontinued and are now out of print.

In August 2018, Deadline Hollywood reported that Fremantle was remastering the series. The series was released on Amazon Prime Video and Hulu in HD and Pluto TV in 2019. Due to expired licenses for much of the show's musical soundtrack, many of the show's episodes are either cut to remove songs, or re-scored and re-edited with new "soundalike" tracks. Visual Entertainment Incorporated released seasons 1–9 on DVD for the first time in the United States on May 3, 2021, with a Blu-ray release on May 21.

In popular culture
The show is the subject of a running gag on Friends, where Chandler and Joey would watch Baywatch together religiously, including over the phone when Joey was living in another apartment. Among other related jokes, Chandler names their pet chicken after Yasmine Bleeth (although the bird later turns out to be male) due to a long-standing crush on the actress. This was largely a joke about Chandler's actor, Matthew Perry, who briefly dated Bleeth in 1995.

Many of the actors from the series have become closely associated with their roles in the series. David Hasselhoff has often referenced or satirized his role as Mitch Buchannon, notably in The SpongeBob SquarePants Movie; in which he appears in lifeguard attire similar to Mitch, runs across a beach in slow-motion, and displays superhuman swimming abilities similar to Mitch's own feats of athleticism.

Babewatch is a satirical term sometimes used in connection with the series, which has been used by the humor magazine Mad and by television commentators. The term was also used for a series of pornographic films released between 1994 and 1999 in list of feature film series with 11 to 20 entries.

Baywatch is prominently featured in the 2006 mockumentary film Borat in which the character Borat Sagdiyev (played by Sacha Baron Cohen), a Kazakh journalist with a misconstrued understanding of American customs and pop culture, becomes obsessed with Pamela Anderson after seeing her in an episode of the series (which he believes to be a documentary) and travels to the United States in a failed attempt to court her and later attempts to abduct her. In a deleted scene, Borat creates a pilot episode of a Kazakh remake of Baywatch entitled Sexydrownwatch, which features "I'm Always Here" and Alexandra Paul reprising her role as Stephanie.

The red swimsuit that the actresses wore in the series have become iconic. The suits were custom fitted for each actress; Alexandra Paul wore a suit with a higher neckline while shorter cast members wore suits with higher cut legs to give the illusion of height.

Baywatch running 
"Baywatch running" refers to the show's numerous scenes, particularly in the opening credits, of its cast members running across the beach in slow motion, usually wearing distinctive red lifeguard gear. The trope is closely associated with the show and often referenced directly in parodies.

Related media

Film adaptation

The film adaptation is a comedy, written and directed by Jeremy Garelick. Garelick's previous successes include the rewrite of The Hangover.

In September 2012, it was announced that Reno 911! co-creator and star Robert Ben Garant would direct the film version of Baywatch for Paramount Pictures.

In October 2014, it was announced that Paramount was moving forward with its big-screen adaptation of Baywatch and has loosely attached Dwayne Johnson to the project. The studio also hired Justin Malen to rewrite and attached the comedy writing team of Sean Anders and John Morris to direct.

In July 2015, it was announced Seth Gordon would direct with Damian Shannon and Mark Swift having written the latest script with Dwayne Johnson still attached to star.

On August 10, 2015, it was announced that Zac Efron had been cast in the film. Johnson also announced that the film will be R-Rated. The report stated, "The story centers on a by-the-book and very serious lifeguard (Johnson) who is forced to team up with a young rule-flouting hothead (Efron) in order to save their beach from environmental destruction at the hands of an oil tycoon." That same month, reports were saying that Kelly Brook was in contention to star in the film as C.J. Parker, with Kate Upton and Charlotte McKinney also on the shortlist, but Brook denied the rumor the following day on Instagram. Brook later confirmed that she had read the script but was still uncertain if she would appear.

On November 9, 2015, it was reported that several actresses, including Alexandra Daddario, Nina Dobrev, Ashley Benson, Alexandra Shipp, Shelley Hennig, Bianca Santos, and Denyse Tontz, were in the running for the female lead, with the possibility that some of them could join the film in different roles and other unnamed actresses could be in the running as well. On November 18, 2015, Johnson confirmed Daddario (who previously worked with Johnson on San Andreas) for the role of Summer, originally played by Eggert in the TV series, and revealed the casting of C.J. and other roles would soon be announced. On January 4, 2016, Johnson announced that actress and model Kelly Rohrbach was cast as C.J. for the film. On January 11, 2016, The Hollywood Reporter reported that Priyanka Chopra was in talks to appear in the film in a villainous role. On February 16, 2016, Chopra and Johnson released a video to confirm her participation in the above-mentioned role. On January 20, 2016, a release date of May 19, 2017, was announced and Ilfenesh Hadera joined the cast as Stef, the love interest of Johnson's character. On January 27, 2016, Variety reported that Jon Bass was cast as Ronnie, described as funny, awkward and a skilled disco dancer who falls in love with C.J. at the beach.

The film was released in the United States on May 25, 2017, by Paramount Pictures, and grossed $177.4 million worldwide.

Potential reboot series
As of August 2018, Deadline Hollywood reported that FremantleMedia International were eyeing a reboot of the franchise.

Baywatch: The Documentary
In 2019, it was announced that Baywatch was being revived as documentary feature film. As they explained on the Factual America podcast, filmmakers Matthew Felker and Brian Corso lined up some of the show's top-billed castmembers to take a walk down memory lane for Baywatch: The Documentary and talk about their time on the show and the hours they spent in skimpy red suits.

See also
 Baywatch: Hawaiian Wedding
 Baywatch: White Thunder at Glacier Bay
 Baywatch the Movie: Forbidden Paradise
 Baywatch Nights (Baywatch spin-off)
 Son of the Beach (Baywatch parody)
 Beach Heat: Miami (softcore version)
 Lifeguard, 1976 lifeguard film starring original Baywatch star Parker Stevenson
 Malibu Rescue (Family-friendly Baywatch parody)
 Pacific Blue – Series often described as "Baywatch on bikes." Carmen Electra guest-starred as her character Lani McKenzie in the episode "Heartbeat"
 Thunder in Paradise – Series from the creators of Baywatch
 Sheena – Series from the co-creator of Baywatch and stars Gena Lee Nolin and John Allen Nelson
 SAF3 – Series from the creators of Baywatch

References

External links
 Baywatch – Official website
 Baywatch on YouTube
 Baywatch on Facebook
 
  (film adaptation)

 
1980s American drama television series
1989 American television series debuts
1990 American television series endings
1990s American drama television series
2000s American drama television series
2001 American television series endings
American action television series
American television soap operas
American primetime television soap operas
English-language television shows
First-run syndicated television programs in the United States
Lifesaving in the United States
NBC original programming
Surf lifesaving
American action adventure television series
Television series by Fremantle (company)
American television series revived after cancellation
Television shows set in Hawaii
Television shows set in Los Angeles
Television shows set in Los Angeles County, California
Television shows adapted into films
Television shows filmed in Hawaii
Works about lifeguards